Arcahaie is an arrondissement in the Ouest of Haiti. As of 2015, the population was 198,551 inhabitants. Postal codes in the Arcahaie Arrondissement start with the number 64.

The arondissement consists of the following communes: 
 Arcahaie 
 Cabaret

References

Arrondissements of Haiti
Ouest (department)